was a town located in Kitauonuma District, Niigata Prefecture, Japan.

As of 2003, the town had an estimated population of 5,549 and a density of 110.91 persons per km². The total area was 50.03 km².

During the 2004 Chūetsu earthquake, Kawaguchi was the only town to report the maximum value of 7 on the Japan Meteorological Agency seismic intensity scale.

On March 31, 2010, Kawaguchi was merged into the expanded city of Nagaoka.

Transportation

Railway
  JR East - Jōetsu Line
 
  JR East - Iiyama Line
 Echigo-Kawaguchi

Highway
  Kan-etsu Expressway – Echigo-Kawaguchi IC/SA

References

See also
 2004 Chūetsu earthquake

Dissolved municipalities of Niigata Prefecture
Nagaoka, Niigata